Mammea touriga, also known as brown touriga or alligatorbark, is a species of tree in the Calophyllaceae family. It is native to north-eastern Australia.

Description
The species grows as a tree with sticky, honey-coloured sap. The leaves are 13–20 cm long by 4–7 cm wide. The flowers are 20–25 mm in diameter. The fruits are spindle-shaped and 7–10 cm long by 5–7 cm wide, with fallen fruits eaten by musky rat-kangaroos.

Distribution and habitat
The species is endemic to north-eastern Queensland where it has a restricted distribution in the Boonjee area of the Atherton Tableland. It occurs in mature rainforest, often on basalt soils, at elevations of 600–800 m.

References

 
touriga
Endemic flora of Australia
Trees of Australia
Flora of Queensland
Rosids of Australia
Plants described in 1924
Taxa named by Cyril Tenison White
Taxa named by William Douglas Francis